Tahara may refer to:

 Tahara, Victoria, a locality in Australia
 Tahara, Aichi, a city in Japan
 Tohorah or taharah, ritual purification in Judaism
 Tohorot, the sixth and last order of the Mishnah
 Tahara, a stage of bereavement in Judaism
 Taharah, the aspect of purity in Islam
 Tahara (film), 2020 American film directed by Olivia Peace

People with the surname
 Mutsuo Tahara, Supreme Court of Japan justice
 Toshihiko Tahara (born 1961), Japanese idol singer